

In basketball, points are the sum of the score accumulated through free throws or field goals. In National Collegiate Athletic Association (NCAA) Division I basketball, it is considered a notable achievement to reach the 1,000-points scored threshold. In even rarer instances, players have reached the 2,000- and 3,000-point plateaus (no player has ever scored 4,000 or more points at the Division I level). The top 25 highest scorers in NCAA Division I men's basketball history are listed below. The NCAA was not organized into its current divisional format until August 1973. From 1906 to 1955, there were no classifications to the NCAA nor its predecessor, the Intercollegiate Athletic Association of the United States (IAAUS). Then, from 1956 to spring 1973, colleges were classified as either "NCAA University Division (Major College)" or "NCAA College Division (Small College)".

Numerous players among the top 25 scorers in Division I history played in the era before the three-point line was officially adopted in 1986–87. All of the players with a dash through the three-point field goals column were affected by this rule. Hank Gathers of Loyola Marymount is the only three-point shot era player on this list who did not make a single three-point shot. Still later, the NCAA moved the men's three-point line to 6.75 m (22 ft 1.75 in) for the main arc and 6.6 m (21 ft 8 in) in the corners, matching the distance used by the sport's international governing body of FIBA. This last move was implemented in two phases, with Division I adopting the new line in 2019–20 and Divisions II and III doing so in 2020–21. Women's basketball did not adopt the FIBA arc until 2021–22.

Additionally, several of the players on this list played during an era when college freshmen were ineligible to compete at the varsity level and competed on either freshman or junior varsity teams. As freshman and junior varsity statistics do not count toward official NCAA records, three players—Pete Maravich, Oscar Robertson and Elvin Hayes—only had three seasons to compile their totals. Larry Bird redshirted (sat out) his freshman year, and therefore, like Maravich, Robertson, and Hayes, his totals were also achieved in only three seasons. With the advantage of the three-point option and an extra year of varsity eligibility, their already-historical statistics would have been much higher. Maravich, a guard from LSU, not only owns the three highest single season averages in Division I history, but also the highest career total. Remarkably, he scored 3,667 points in a mere 83 games.

Four players on this top 25 list are enshrined in the Naismith Memorial Basketball Hall of Fame: Pete Maravich, Oscar Robertson, Elvin Hayes, and Larry Bird.

Key

Top 25 career scoring leaders

All-time conference scoring leaders 
The following list contains current and defunct Division I conferences' all-time scoring leaders. The "conference founded" column indicates when each conference first began intercollegiate athletic competition, not necessarily when they began basketball. For example, the Great West Conference was established as a football-only conference in 2004 but became an all-sports conference in 2008 (with basketball actually beginning in 2009–10). Also note that some of the schools on this list are no longer in the conference in which they are identified. Utah, for instance, is currently a member of the Pac-12 Conference, but when Keith Van Horn set the scoring record it was still a member of the Western Athletic Conference. Similarly, BYU is currently in the West Coast Conference and will join the Big 12 Conference in July 2023, but the career of its scoring leader Jimmer Fredette coincided with the program's last four seasons in the Mountain West Conference.

All-time schools' scoring leaders 

These schools are full, current members of NCAA Division I, meaning they have finished the process of joining Division I or its historical equivalent. Some of the records below were set while the school was still in a lower division and are not intended to be solely Division I era scoring records; if no season-specific link exists, it is because the record was set while the school was a member of a lower division. Through 2022–23, the oldest school record is held by Jim Lacy at Loyola of Maryland, whose 2,199 points were last scored in 1949. The newest record holder, meanwhile, is Drew Timme of Gonzaga, who set his record on March 7, 2023 during his non-redshirt senior season in 2022–23. Lipscomb's John Pierce holds college basketball's all-time, all-divisions scoring mark of 4,230 points. He played from 1990 to 1994 while the Bisons were still a member of the NAIA.

All schools are listed with their current athletic brand names, which do not necessarily match those used when a school's scoring leader was active.

Footnotes

References
General

Specific

NCAA Division I men's basketball statistical leaders